Van den Goorbergh is a Dutch surname. Notable people with this surname are:
 Edith van den Goorbergh (born 1933), Dutch theologian
 Jurgen van den Goorbergh (born 1969), Dutch motorcycle road racer
 Wim van den Goorbergh (born 1948), Dutch economist and banker

Dutch-language surnames
Surnames of Dutch origin